Ernassa cruenta is a moth of the family Erebidae first described by Walter Rothschild in 1909. It is found in French Guiana, Ecuador, Peru and the Brazilian state of Amazonas.

References

Phaegopterina
Moths described in 1909